Pataudi State was a small princely state in India, established in 1804 during the East India Company rule in India.

The state formed a part of the Delhi Territory in the Ceded and Conquered Provinces. It was under the suzerainty of the Commissioner of Delhi. It had an area of 52 square miles and included one town, Pataudi, and 40 villages, ruled by the Pataudi family.

History
The state of Pataudi was established in 1804 by the British East India Company, when Faiz Talab Khan, an Afghan Muslim Pashtun of the Barech tribe, who was made the first Nawab, aided them in their battle against the Maratha Empire, during the Second Anglo-Maratha War. The family traces their origin to 16th century India, when their ancestors immigrated from present day Afghanistan to India during the period of the Lodi dynasty.
The 8th Nawab, Iftikhar Ali Khan Pataudi, played cricket for both England and India and captained the latter. His son the last Nawab also captained the Indian cricket team.

At the end of the British Raj and with the political integration of India in 1948, the princely state of Pataudi was absorbed into the new Dominion of India (later Republic of India).  In 1971, by virtue of the 26th amendment to the Constitution of India, the Government of India abolished all official symbols of princely India, including titles, privileges, and remuneration (privy purses).

The former Pataudi Palace was a hotel for some time, but is now owned privately by Saif Ali Khan, the current patriarch of the family.

Rulers
Rulers bore the title of the Nawab.

 Faiz Talab Khan (1804–1829)
 Akbar Ali Khan (1829–1862)
 Mohammad Ali Taqi Khan (1862–1867)
 Mohammad Mukhtar Husain Khan (1867–1878)
 Mohammad Mumtaz Husain Ali Khan (1878–1898)
 Mohammad Muzaffar Ali Khan (1898–1913)
 Mohammad Ibrahim Ali Khan (1913–1917)
 Mohammad Iftikhar Ali Khan (1917–1948)(1948-1952) (just as titular nawab after merging with India)
Mansoor Ali Khan Pataudi (1952–1971) (Title abolished in 1971).

Demographics

Religion

See also
 Political integration of India
 Afghan diaspora
Nawab of Pataudi

Notes

References

External links

Princely states of Punjab
Muslim princely states of India
History of Haryana
Pashtun dynasties
Gurgaon district
Pataudi